The fanray (Platyrhina sinensis) is a species of ray in the family Platyrhinidae that lives in the western Pacific Ocean. It eats fish and crustaceans and has poor mobility. Males live to age five and females to age twelve, with both sexes maturing between two and five years. It is probable that its population is declining due to being caught as a bycatch.

Description 
Its body is flat throughout and shaped like a fan. The species' upperside is brown in color, its underside white, and the edge of its body yellow. It has wide nostrils, small eyes, a short snout, and a transversal through its mouth splitting it. It has multiple small teeth and thorn-like scales on the upperside of its body.

Behavior 
The fanray eats small fish and crustaceans, specifically shrimp and mysids. To feed, it usually stays on the sea floor until there is an opportunity to capture food; it is a nocturnal species. It exhibits oviparity and mates in April or May. It swims slowly, due to the fact that its only way to move is by moving its tail forwards and backwards.

Males have a lifespan of five years, maturing between two and four years, while females have a lifespan of twelve years, maturing between three and five years. Specimens at Ariake Bay, the most common area the species occurs in, were surveyed from May 2002 to September 2006 for their age, growth, and sexual maturity. The survey revealed that females grow slower than males but achieve a greater total length as an adult. It also determined that in comparison to other related species, the ray grows and matures quickly, and lives for a short amount of time.

Habitat and distribution 
In particular, it is found off the coasts of China, Japan, Taiwan, Korea, Vietnam, and possibly Indonesia. The species is the most abundant elasmobranch species in Ariake Bay, Kyūshū, and is also common in the Yellow Sea and Bohai Sea.

The species is caught as bycatch in gillnets and trawls, sometimes being discarded but other times made use of. However, its population has not been negatively affected by these activities. Its flesh can be eaten fresh or after being dried.  Its exact population or population trend is unknown, but its population in the East China Sea is known to be decreasing due to trawling activities. The fact that it lives in shallower waters makes it easy to be caught by fisheries. The species is the most common in several countries in the Northern part of its range. Currently, no conservation actions or restrictions are taking place on behalf of the species. Because of its probable population decline, the IUCN Red List lists it as an endangered species.

References

External links
 Platyrhina sinensis on FishWise Pro
 Platyrhina sinensis on BoldSystems
 Platyrhina sinensis on Discover Life
 Platyrhina sinensis on Marine Barcoding of Life

Myliobatiformes
Taxa named by Marcus Elieser Bloch
Taxa named by Johann Gottlob Theaenus Schneider
Fish described in 1801
Fish of the Pacific Ocean